Helmut Schmid (1925–1992) was a German actor. He was the husband of actress Liselotte Pulver from 1961 until his death.

Filmography

References

External links
 
 

German male film actors
German male television actors
20th-century German male actors
1925 births
1992 deaths
People from Neu-Ulm